J.S.S. Academy of Technical Education, Noida (JSSATEN), in its full name Jagadguru Sri Shivarathreeshwara Academy of Technical Education, Noida (Established 1998) is a private engineering institute affiliated to Dr. A.P.J. Abdul Kalam Technical University situated in Sector 62, Noida. It is consistently ranked among the top engineering colleges  affiliated to  Dr. A.P.J. Abdul Kalam Technical University. JSSATEN is part of the JSS Mahavidyapeetha group of Institutions, Mysuru established in 1954 by Jagadguru Sri Shivarathri Rajendra Mahaswamiji.

Science & Technology Entrepreneurship Park (STEP) 
JSSATEN also has a Science & Technology Entrepreneurship Park (STEP) within their campus above the Library. It offers facilities such as nursery sheds, testing and calibration facilities, precision tool room/central workshop, prototype development, business facilitation, computing, data bank, library and documentation, communication, seminar hall/conference room, common facilities such as phone, telex, fax, photocopying. It offers services like testing and calibration, consultancy. Training, technical support services, business facilitation services, database and documentation services, quality assurance services and common utility services.

The Science & Technology Entrepreneurs Park is a registered society under the Society Registration Act, 1860.

Accreditation
The institutes programs are accredited by the National Board of Accreditation (NBA). Electronics & Communication Engineering, Computer Science Engineering and Information Technology programs have been accredited for the period 2020-2023 while Mechanical Engineering and Electrical Engineering courses have been accredited for the period 2018–2021.

Girls Hostel Spy Camera Controversy 
In September 2014, a female student found three spy cameras in the washroom of the girls' hostel. The camera was fixed with duct tape and was hidden under the wash basin. As the news broke out, almost 4,000 students came out on roads to protest against the management and calling for an immediate probe and necessary punitive action. An FIR was filed against four people, which includes the housekeeping staff and security guards.

Ranking
The institute has been ranked in the 201-250 rank band by NIRF for the rankings released in the year 2020.

TEDxJSSATE 
TEDxJSSATE is an independently organised TED event, which saw some of the notable guest speakers including Nikita Anand and Gaurav Chaudhary (aka Technical Guruji).

Notable alumni 
 Swati Maliwal, women's rights activist

References

Uttar Pradesh
Dr. A.P.J. Abdul Kalam Technical University
Business schools in Uttar Pradesh
Educational institutions established in 1998
1998 establishments in Uttar Pradesh